Jonathan Thomas "John" Squire (born 24 November 1962) is an English musician, songwriter and painter. He was the guitarist for The Stone Roses, a rock band in which he formed a songwriting partnership with lead singer Ian Brown. After leaving the Stone Roses he went on to found The Seahorses and has since released two solo albums. In 2007, Squire gave up music to fully commit to painting. However, he later returned to music when the Stone Roses reformed in 2011. When the Stone Roses disbanded for a second time in 2017 Squire once again returned to painting. However, he continues to play guitar occasionally, including making guest appearances for two shows with Liam Gallagher at Knebworth in 2022.

Squire has been described as one of the most accomplished and influential British rock guitarists of the late 1980s and early 1990s, known for his chiming melodies, spiraling riffs and live solos. He was voted the 13th greatest guitarist of the last 30 years in a national poll by BBC 6 Music in 2010.

Early life
Squire was born in Broadheath, Altrincham, Cheshire. He grew up on Sylvan Avenue in Timperley, around the corner from Ian Brown, and after attending Heyes Lane Junior School, he passed the eleven plus exam and went on to attend Altrincham Grammar School for Boys. As a child he excelled at art. He formed a close friendship with Ian Brown during their last two years at school together after Brown aided him in a fight with a school bully. The two further bonded over a shared love for punk rock, particularly the Clash.

Squire and Brown moved on to South Trafford College after passing O-Levels. Brown got expelled and Squire dropped out shortly after in order to start a band. Although Squire had a couple of guitar lessons, he was largely self-taught.

The Stone Roses
In the early 1980s Squire and Brown founded a band, Patrol, that eventually became the Stone Roses. Squire was lead guitarist, and the partnership between him and Brown formed the heart of the band's lyrical and musical output.

The Stone Roses became one of the most influential acts of its era. Their 1989 eponymous debut album quickly achieved the status of a classic in the UK, and topped NME'''s list of the Greatest British Albums of All Time. Squire (now calling himself John, instead of his birth name of Jonathan) co-wrote all of the tracks with Brown and painted the cover art, a Jackson Pollock-influenced piece containing references to the May 1968 riots in Paris.

The band's second album, Second Coming was released in 1994. It featured a heavier blues-rock sound, similar to Led Zeppelin and the Allman Brothers Band, but fused with Ian Brown's distinct Britpop vocal style. The album also featured Squire's vocals for the first time on 'Tightrope' and 'How Do You Sleep'. Squire wrote the majority of its songs alone. The album was met with mixed reaction from fans, and shortly after band infighting and rumoured cocaine abuse led to his departure from the band on 1 April 1996. The band dissolved six months later.

The Seahorses and solo career
With three previously unknown musicians, Squire formed a new band, The Seahorses, in 1996. The band's only album Do it Yourself was released in 1997. The Seahorses disbanded due to creative differences in 1999.

Following the demise of the Seahorses, Squire continued work with drummer Mark Heaney and ex-Verve bassist Simon Jones along with new vocalist Duncan Baxter as John Squire's Skunkworks, but left prior to the band releasing material as the Shining.

Squire released his first solo album, Time Changes Everything in 2002. A concept album followed in 2004 entitled Marshall's House. Squire has also said that he has recorded a third album, however he has decided not to release it as he felt that promoting and touring the album would take the fun out of the music, and turn it into a job rather than a hobby. This is the second time that Squire has recorded an album and opted to keep it unreleased, as he did the same in 1999 as a part of the Seahorses, when they recorded an album, set to be named "Minus Blue" or "Motorcade", but decided to break up rather than release the album.

Artwork
Besides music, Squire is also a published artist. His artwork has adorned the singles, album covers and promotional posters for his and the Stone Roses' music. In the 1980s, Squire's artistic style was heavily influenced by the action painting technique of Jackson Pollock. In recent years, Squire has shown a broader use of media and has incorporated newer influences to his work. One such item – a surfboard covered with Beach Boys song lyrics, which was for the War Child charity to auction – featured on the cover for Travis's 1997 single release "U16 Girls" and their debut album Good Feeling. In 2004, Squire held two well-received art exhibitions in London and Manchester.

He has exhibited his artwork at the Smithfield Gallery (July 2007) and the Dazed Gallery, London (September – October 2007). At the Smithfield Gallery opening, Squire told a reporter from the Manchester Evening News that he was giving up music for good. He explained that "I'm enjoying this far too much to go back to music." When asked about a Stone Roses reunion, he said it was "highly unlikely".

In January 2009, Squire launched a new exhibition of his art entitled Heavy Metal Semantics, in London, and further exhibitions in Oldham, Austria and Tokyo later in the year. Further exhibitions include Edinburgh in August 2010, Brussels in early 2011 and London in 2019.

Intentions for a Stone Roses reunion
After leaving the Stone Roses, Squire had a lasting feud with ex-bandmate Ian Brown, with the pair not having spoken in over a decade since Squire's departure from the band. In a 2005 Q magazine article, Squire blasted Brown, claiming "When he (Brown) was stoned, he was at best a tuneless knob and at worst a paranoid mess" (this was in response to queries about what had gone wrong with the Second Coming recording sessions, and the state of Brown's vocal due to his cannabis intake). Although both Brown and Squire performed Stone Roses songs in their solo gigs, a band reunion seemed unlikely. Squire was interviewed in June 2007 by Dave Haslam on XFM Manchester radio and discussed his current work as an artist, and claimed that even if Brown phoned him and suggested a Stone Roses reunion, he would turn the offer down. But in an interview on The Culture Show in 2008, Squire stated: "I went to that Led Zeppelin reunion show, and on the way back in the car I was thinking it would be good to do something like that one day."

In March 2009, Squire appeared to put an end to speculation surrounding the Stone Roses' reunion by defacing one of his artworks with the text "I have no desire whatsoever to desecrate the grave of seminal Manchester pop group the Stone Roses." Also on 19 March 2009, Squire appeared on the BBC's Newsnight, and when asked if a reunion would ever occur, he stated that it would "absolutely most definitely not". He said he came on air to address the fans once and for all and also, "to stop the phones ringing." He also stated his belief that music is a young person's game.

In March 2011, Brown and Squire met at the funeral of Mani's mother, leading to speculation that the band would reform. This was angrily denied at the time by Mani. However, on 18 October 2011, at London's Soho Hotel, the Stone Roses announced that they would reunite for the first time in fifteen years, playing three shows at Heaton Park, Manchester, on 29 and 30 June and 1 July 2012 as part of an extensive Reunion Tour, and on 2 December 2011 Brown and Squire performed together live for the first time since 1995. They joined Mick Jones from the Clash, the Farm and Pete Wylie at the Manchester Ritz in aid of the Justice for Hillsborough campaign. They performed "Elizabeth My Dear" as a duo before being joined by Mick Jones and the Farm for renditions of the Clash's "Bankrobber" and "Armagideon Time" with Ian Brown taking on lead vocals for the three songs. The Stone Roses played a European tour in the summer of 2012. The band played around the world, playing their last concert in 2017. Squire then returned to painting. In a 2019 interview he said he had written and recorded some songs but only his wife had heard them. 

On 3 and 4 June 2022, Squire made his first stage appearances in five years at the encore of Liam Gallagher's two Knebworth House concerts, as a guest guitarist on the song "Champagne Supernova". These mirrored the guest appearances he had previously made at Oasis' record-breaking Knebworth shows in 1996. 

Discography
Albums
 Time Changes Everything (2002) No.17 UK
 Marshall's House (2004) No.90 UK

Singles
 "Joe Louis" (2002) No.43 UK
 "Room In Brooklyn" (2004) No.44 UK

Live albums and EPS
 Time Changes Everything'' Live EP (Japan only) (2003)

See also

:Category:Songs written by John Squire

References

Bibliography

External links
 Official site

1962 births
Living people
20th-century English painters
English male painters
21st-century English painters
Alternative rock guitarists
Alternative rock singers
British alternative rock musicians
Madchester musicians
English atheists
English male singers
English rock guitarists
English rock singers
English songwriters
Lead guitarists
Musicians from Manchester
People educated at Altrincham Grammar School for Boys
People from Altrincham
The Stone Roses members
English male guitarists
The Seahorses members
The Shining (band) members